Zobellella aerophila is a strictly aerobic, rod-shaped and motile bacterium from the genus of Zobellella which has been isolated from seashore sand from Dokdo in Korea.

References 

Aeromonadales
Bacteria described in 2011